Hristiyan Hristov (born 9 April 1995 in Varna) is a Bulgarian footballer who plays as a goalkeeper.

Career
Hristiyan started the 2013/14 season as Cherno More's third goalkeeper.  In January 2014, Hristov was included in the 25-man squad for their training camp in Turkey. He made his first team league début in a 1-3 away  defeat against Ludogorets on 18 May 2014, coming on as a substitute for Nik Dashev.

Career statistics

References

External links

1995 births
Living people
Sportspeople from Varna, Bulgaria
Bulgarian footballers
Association football goalkeepers
PFC Cherno More Varna players
FC Chernomorets Balchik players
FC Lokomotiv Gorna Oryahovitsa players
PFC Spartak Varna players
First Professional Football League (Bulgaria) players
Second Professional Football League (Bulgaria) players